Malus × micromalus, the midget crabapple or Kaido crabapple, is a species in the genus Malus, in the family Rosaceae.

References

micromalus
Crabapples
Hybrid plants
Flora of China